Dimethandrolone dodecylcarbonate (developmental code name CDB-4730), or dimethandrolone dodecanoylcarbonate, also known as 7α,11β-dimethyl-19-nortestosterone 17β-dodecylcarbonate, is a synthetic and orally active anabolic–androgenic steroid (AAS) and a derivative of nandrolone (19-nortestosterone) which was developed by the Contraceptive Development Branch (CDB) of the National Institute of Child Health and Human Development (NICHD) and has not been marketed at this time. It is an androgen ester – specifically, the C17β dodecylcarbonate ester of dimethandrolone (7α,11β-dimethyl-19-nortestosterone) – and acts as a prodrug of dimethandrolone in the body.

See also
 List of androgen esters

References

Abandoned drugs
Androgen esters
Androgens and anabolic steroids
Contraception for males
Dodecylcarbonate esters
Estranes
Enones
Prodrugs
Progestogens